Kotturu may refer to:

Kotturu, Karnataka, a town in Vijayanagara district, Karnataka, India
Kotturu, Srikakulam, a village in Srikakulam district, Andhra Pradesh, India

See also
 Kothuru (disambiguation)
 Kottur (disambiguation)